This is a ranking of the highest-grossing Bangladeshi films screened at cinemas in Bangladesh and globally. This is the ranking of the highest-grossing Bangladeshi films which have released after the Independence of Bangladesh. Films generate income from several revenue streams, including box office sales (admissions), theatrical exhibition, television broadcast rights, and music album sales. There is no official tracking of sales and online sources pualblishing data are frequently unreliable.

Highest-grossing films 
This is the list of highest-grossing Bangladeshi films listed as per worldwide net figures at the time of their release.

Highest-grossing films by year of release
This is the list of highest-grossing Bangladeshi films by year of release. These films are listed as per their worldwide gross figures at time of release. These figures are not adjusted for ticket prices inflation.

Highest opening weeks

Most expensive films
This is a list of the most expensive Bangladeshi films, with budgets given in Bangladeshi taka.

Highest-grossing franchises and film series

1. Franchises & Film Series Name : Purno Doirgho Prem Kahini
2. Franchises & Film Series Name: Password
3. Franchises & Film Series Name: Mission Extreme

See also

Cinema of Bangladesh
List of Bangladeshi films
List of highest-grossing Bengali films

References

Lists of Bangladeshi films
Bangladesh